Keyvan Lewis Jenkins (born January 6, 1961 in Stockton, California) is a former running back who played 8 seasons in the Canadian Football League.  He also played two seasons in the National Football League. He won the Grey Gup for the BC Lions in 1985, and with the Calgary Stampeders in 1992.

1961 births
Living people
Players of Canadian football from Stockton, California
American football running backs
Canadian football running backs
UNLV Rebels football players
BC Lions players
Calgary Stampeders players
Sacramento Gold Miners players
San Diego Chargers players
Kansas City Chiefs players
Players of American football from Stockton, California
National Football League replacement players